Karl Bermingham (born 6 October 1985) is an Irish former professional footballer who played as a forward.

He began his career in the Premier League with Manchester City spending the first three years of his professional career, also having brief loan spells with both Lincoln City and Burnley before returning to his native Ireland. He remained in Irish football for the rest of his career playing for Newry City, Derry City, Waterford United, Monaghan United, Shelbourne and Longford Town. He has represented the Republic of Ireland at schoolboy level.

Career

Early career
Bermingham played for the Irish-based club until moving to Manchester City's youth system. He made his league debut, however, for Lincoln City, where he spent three months on loan at the end of the 2004–05 season. At the start of the 2005–06 season he made a number of appearances in first team friendlies for Manchester City but did not play any competitive matches. 

During Autumn 2005 he was loaned out to Burnley, and was released by Manchester City at the end of the 2005–06 season. He had an unsuccessful trial with Dunfermline Athletic in July 2006 before signing with Newry City in October, scoring on his debut against Coleraine.

Return to Ireland
In early 2007, he was invited to join Derry City on trial prior to the impending kick-off of the 2007 League of Ireland season. Impressing in pre-season, he earned a one-year contract with the Candystripes on 2 February 2007.

In July 2007 Bermingham joined Waterford United and made his first appearance for the Blues against Shamrock Rovers on 10 July 2007. He scored his first goal for the Blues during his home debut against Sligo Rovers in a 2–1 loss.

Bermingham signed for Monaghan United for the 2009 First Division season. In his first season with the Mons, Bermingham scored 17 goals, equalling the club's single season record, held by Andy Myler. The 2010 season was not as successful for Bermingham, with manager Mick Cooke preferring a strikeforce of Sean Brennan and Philly Hughes, but Bermingham still managed to score 10 goals.

Bermingham parted company with Monaghan United following the 2010 season. He scored 29 goals in 70 league and cup appearances for the club. On 20 February 2011, Bermingham signed for Shelbourne. Bermingham secured promotion with Shelbourne to the Premier Division in 2011 but struggled to score goals with one goal in 24 league and cup appearances. He also made an appearance for Shelbourne as a substitute during their 2011 FAI Cup final defeat to Sligo Rovers.

Bermingham departed Shelbourne at end of 2011 and signed for Longford Town ahead of their First Division campaign in 2012. He was released by Longford at the end of the 2012 season.

Career statistics

Correct as of 6 November 2011.

Competitions include Setanta Sports Cup, Leinster Senior Cup, Munster Senior Cup and League of Ireland promotion/relegation play-offs

References

External links
Karl Bermingham's profile at www.shelbournefc.com

1985 births
Living people
Association footballers from County Dublin
Association football forwards
Republic of Ireland association footballers
English Football League players
NIFL Premiership players
League of Ireland players
Manchester City F.C. players
Lincoln City F.C. players
Burnley F.C. players
Newry City F.C. players
Derry City F.C. players
Waterford F.C. players
Monaghan United F.C. players
Shelbourne F.C. players
Belvedere F.C. players
Republic of Ireland under-21 international footballers
People from Clondalkin
Sportspeople from South Dublin (county)